

The Alva Fleharty House in Boise, Idaho, is a -story Queen Ann house designed by Tourtellotte & Co. and constructed by H.A. Palmer and Harrison Bryan in 1902. The house reveals a shingle style influence in its gables and front, 2-story beveled bay. It was added to the National Register of Historic Places in 1982.

Alva Fleharty
A native of Galesburg, Illinois, Alva Fleharty first worked for the Omaha Bee then became foreman of the composing room at the Salt Lake Tribune before moving to Boise in 1901 to manage the composing room and telegraph office at the Idaho Statesman. He worked for the Statesman over two years, but in 1903 when the West Side Index in Newman, California, was for sale Alva and Maude (Chandler) Fleharty purchased the Index and moved to California. At the time, the Flehartys had lived in the Alva Fleharty House less than one year. They sold the house to W.G.M. Allen in 1903.

Fleharty published the Index for 33 years. He died in Turlock, California, in 1947.

See also
 Fort Street Historic District

References

External links
 
 The West Side Index, brief history includes publisher Alva "Alvin" Fleharty

		
National Register of Historic Places in Boise, Idaho
Houses in Boise, Idaho
Queen Anne architecture in Idaho
Houses completed in 1902
Houses on the National Register of Historic Places in Idaho